The Grieg Academy is a disputed historical term used to refer to the higher education music programs in Bergen, Norway (birthplace of composer Edvard Grieg), as well as various collaborations across music institutions in Bergen. However, since 2016, due to mergers between several Norwegian institutions, the structure of Grieg Academy has changed and its remaining components are expected to be a doctoral research school (Grieg Research School in Interdisciplinary Music Studies)  and various research groups. Specifically, this is due to a merger between the University of Bergen’s Faculty of Humanities with the Bergen Academy of Art and Design, as well as a nearly simultaneous merger between Bergen University College and two other university colleges in western Norway: Stord/Haugesund University College and Sogn og Fjordane University College to become, in January 2017, Western Norway University of Applied Sciences (HVL) The music programs across HVL briefly became the largest music department in western Norway in terms of the number of full time teachers, but this has rapidly changed due to an unofficial policy of not replacing retiring teachers.

Due to an array of mergers, the background of "Grieg Academy" is complex. One prominent institution, which until recently has referred to itself in English as the "Grieg Institute" (or "Griegakademiet - Institutt for musikk" in Norwegian) is the music conservatory in Bergen, and a department of the University of Bergen (UiB). However, Norway's oldest music degree program, and the institution that has for the longest been called "Griegakademiet" in Norwegian - and "Grieg Academy" in English - is the music education department incorporated into Bergen University College (HiB), which in 2017 becomes part of Western Norway University of Applied Sciences. "Griegakademiet" has appeared for many years in official documents and on street signs for all entrances as well as hallways to the former music department of HiB (in Landås), which was the largest music education program in Norway (with alumni of over 1000 music teachers), offering bachelor's and master's degrees and teacher certification. HiB is also the "Grieg Academy" that in 2002 hosted one of the world's largest music education conferences. The UiB music department, in contrast to the HiB music department, used to be called the "Bergen Conservatory," and now has a slightly larger number of full-time music faculty, emphasizes elite performance studies rather than music teacher education, and is more centrally-located in downtown Bergen.

Significance of bi-institutional context
Although the scenario of a shared name might appear to suggest competing interests (and indeed there was resistance to a full merger proposed in the 1990s), several instructors have taught music concurrently at both institutions, and some signs of a healthy partnership have been evident between musicians and programs at these two schools which have rather different emphases. According to the history explained in Norwegian on the Grieg Academy-UiB's official website, “towards the end of the 1980s, the conservatory faced major restructuring, and a government report recommended closer cooperation with the University of Bergen. In the autumn of 1995, Nina Grieg's 150th birthday and 90 years after Torgrim Castberg first opened the Music Academy, the Conservatoire was founded as an ‘institute’ at the University of Bergen, and ‘Grieg Academy’ was established as a ceiling (or umbrella ...) of all music education programs under both the University of Bergen and Bergen University College.” Also, according to a 1996 report from the website of University of Bergen, “The Grieg Academy is a partnership between the University and Bergen University College who has since earlier been offering a major in music education. This academic partnership rests on three pillars: music pedagogy at the former teachers college and applied/creative music and musicology at the University.” Due to both marketing strategies and inter-institutional politics, the Grieg Academy-UiB has in recent years increasingly taken a public stance implying that it is "the" Grieg Academy, yet for those who know this history it remains undeniably clear that "the Grieg Academy" has actually referred to multiple institutions, University of Bergen and Bergen University College, with some forms of collaboration. In recent years, the folk music school Ole Bull Academy in nearby Voss (named after renowned violin virtuoso Ole Bull), has also been to some extent brought under the Grieg Academy umbrella. The name Grieg may be traced to Norway's most famous composer Edvard Grieg, a native son of Bergen, and the tradition of naming music schools after famous composers is evident across Europe, including the Sibelius Academy, Liszt Academy, and Mozarteum.

Grieg Academy-UiB
The Music department of the University of Bergen (UiB), since 2017 incorporated into the Faculty of Fine Art, Music and Design, was founded in 1905 as the Bergen Musikkonservatorium (Bergen Music Conservatory) by T. Castberg. It offers 4-year undergraduate programs in Performance, Composition and Pedagogy/Music Education, and also 2-year Masters programs in Performance, Composition and Ethnomusicology. The Academy maintains a population of approximately 160 students, A permanent staff of 25 and numerous part-time faculty. The Griegakademiet-Institutt for musikk has also partnered itself with two of the elite bands in the Hordaland area: the brass band Eikanger-Bjørsvik Musikklag and the wind band Dragefjellets Musikkorps (Bergen Symphonic Band). Many faculty members are also members and principal players of the Bergen Philharmonic Orchestra. Notable faculty include professor Per Hannevold (bassoon and orchestral studies), professor (II) Gro Schibsted Sandvik (flute), guitarist Stein-Erik Olsen, professor Brynjulf Stige (music therapist), Tom Solomon (ethnomusicologist), and professor Harald Bjørkøy (voice). Alumni from the Academy include Leif Ove Andsnes, Harald Sæverud, and Torstein Aagaard-Nilsen. The department's music therapy program, Grieg Academy Center for Music Therapy (GAMUT) is especially well-known, and attracts many postgraduate students and funding for PhD research projects.

Grieg Academy-HiB
The original Grieg Academy- the music department in the Faculty of Education at Bergen University College (HiB/HVL) - was the very first institution in Norway to offer a music degree (established in Landås in 1958 by Ivar Benum), and the first to offer a postgraduate degree in music education, and was the nation's largest music education degree program until recent years, with studies primarily for those who plan to become music teachers, music teacher educators, or arts researchers and cultural policy-makers. Although its emphasis is on music education rather than performance studies, the faculty includes performers, composers, conductors, and musicologists, and it has been affiliated with arts research centers for which PhD students are frequently in residence. Notable music Professors and Lecturers at HiB include Thorolf Krüger (educational theorist), David G. Hebert (sociomusicologist), Tiri Bergesen Schei (choral conductor and music phenomenologist), Catharina Christophersen (educational researcher), Jostein Stalheim (composer), and Egil Haugland (guitarist and guitar maker).

Notable alumni of the HiB Griegakademiet at Landås include renowned brass band conductor and arranger Tom Brevik, Opera Bergen producer and director Anne Randine Øverby, choral conductor Per Oddvar Hildre, award-winning jazz pianist Dag Arnesen, and several of Norway's most renowned songwriters and rock musicians, such as the leaders of Kaizers Orchestra and Odd Nordstoga, and the school is often given some credit for the recent “Bergen Wave" of popular music. Professional opera singers to have come from the HiB/HVL music department, before seeking additional training in Norway and abroad, include Lise Davidsen and Ingvild Schultze-Florey. In the fields of music academia and music industry/management, notable graduates from HiB-Grieg Academy's music education programs include: Associate Professor Tom Eide Osa, Associate Professor Steinar Saetre, Associate Professor Ketil Thorgersen, CEO Gisle Johnsen, 
and international festival manager/jazz pianist Dr. Oystein Kvinge.

Choir conductor Maria Gamborg Helbekkmo became Emeritus Professor in 2012. Torunn Bakken Hauge (rhythmic music pedagogue) retired in 2018. In 2019, a Full Professor, Njål Vindenes (guitarist), resigned in protest (with much media attention) as the music programs continued to be radically downsized, worsened by a merger and restructure, to become less than half their original size. The department is located on Floor 4 of a new 51,000 square metre building constructed in 2014 for Bergen University College, in Kronstad, just south of downtown Bergen. The HiB Faculty of Education currently has 2300 students and 150 staff members (around 17 of whom are full-time in music at Griegakademiet), and music is the oldest (and formerly, largest) graduate program offered by the Faculty, which is also known for its strong programs in drama, children's literature and other arts. The Faculty offers a PhD degree in education, and additional PhD programs have been under development, as indicated in HiB's strategic plan. According to its website, “Grieg Academy, Bergen University College has exchange agreements with educational institutions in Denmark, Portugal, Spain, Iceland, Sweden, Finland, England, Germany, USA, Australia, Greece and Austria.”

See also
Education in Norway
Music of Norway

References

External links
Official website (University of Bergen)
Network of higher education music programs in western Norway

 
Grieg Academy
Education in Bergen
1905 establishments in Norway